Dyatkovsky District is an administrative and municipal district (raion), one of the twenty-seven in Bryansk Oblast, Russia. It is located in the north of the oblast. Its administrative center is the town of Dyatkovo. Population:   45,773 (2002 Census);  The population of Dyatkovo accounts for 45.9% of the district's total population.

Administrative and municipal divisions
As an administrative division, the district is divided into five rural administrative okrugs, four settlement administrative okrugs, and one urban administrative okrug (Dyatkovsky). Within the framework of municipal divisions, the rural administrative okrugs are incorporated into five rural settlements, while the settlement administrative okrugs and the urban administrative okrug are incorporated into five urban settlements.

Until January 2013, Fokino was incorporated as a town of district significance within Dyatkovsky District and, within the framework of municipal formations, it was incorporated separately from the district as Fokino Urban Okrug. After January 2013, it is both administratively and municipally separate from the district.

References

Notes

Sources

Districts of Bryansk Oblast
